Keith Lawley Gibbs (born 30 December 1933) is a former South African cricketer who played first-class cricket for Orange Free State from 1951 to 1954 and for Transvaal from 1956 to 1960.

Keith Gibbs was a right-arm opening bowler who was a consistent wicket-taker in South African domestic cricket in the 1950s. He twice played for a South African XI against touring teams – against MCC in 1956–57 and the Australians in 1957–58 – but was not selected in the Test team. He took his best figures of 5 for 79 and 3 for 20 when Orange Free State beat Eastern Province in the Currie Cup in 1952–53.

References

External links

1933 births
Living people
People from Bloemfontein
South African cricketers
Gauteng cricketers
Free State cricketers